Sebastián Guerrero Martínez (born 23 September 2000) is a Uruguayan professional footballer who plays as a forward for Montevideo City Torque.

Career
A youth academy graduate of Montevideo City Torque, Guerrero made his professional debut on 31 January 2021 in his club's 3–1 league win against Cerro. He scored his first goal following week in a 4–0 win against Danubio.

Career statistics

Club

References

External links
 

2000 births
Living people
Footballers from Montevideo
Association football forwards
Uruguayan footballers
Uruguayan Primera División players
Argentine Primera División players
Montevideo City Torque players
Club Atlético Platense footballers
Uruguayan expatriate footballers
Uruguayan expatriate sportspeople in Argentina
Expatriate footballers in Argentina